Stakkastadvatnet is a lake on the border of Rogaland and Vestland counties in Norway. The  lake mostly lies in Rogaland along the municipal borders of Haugesund and Tysvær. A very small portion of the northern part of the lake crosses over into the municipality of Sveio in Vestland county. The lake has a small dam on the northwestern edge of the lake. The natural outlet of the lake flows through the dam and into the nearby lake Vigdarvatnet, located to the north.

See also
List of lakes in Norway

References

Sveio
Haugesund
Tysvær
Lakes of Vestland
Lakes of Rogaland